Sarnia is a city in Ontario, Canada.

Sarnia may also refer to:

Places
 Sarnia—Lambton, Ontario, Canada, formerly known as Sarnia, a federal electoral district
 Sarnia (provincial electoral district), Ontario, a riding from 1966 to 1996
 Sarnia 45 Indian Reserve of the Aamjiwnaang First Nation, Ontario
 Rural Municipality of Sarnia No. 221, Saskatchewan, Canada
 Sarnia, the Roman name for the island of Guernsey, Channel Islands

Sports in Sarnia, Ontario
 Sarnia Sting, a junior ice hockey team
 Sarnia Legionnaires (1954–70), a junior ice hockey team 
 Sarnia Legionnaires (1969–), a junior ice hockey team
 Sarnia Arena, home arena of the Legionnaires
 Sarnia Imperials, a football team from 1928 to 1955

Other uses
 , a Second World War Royal Canadian Navy minesweeper
 , a passenger vessel which also served in the First World War as HMS Sarnia
 Sarnia station, Sarnia, Ontario, a Via Rail train station
 Sarnia Chris Hadfield Airport, near Sarnia, Ontario
 Sarnia: An Island Sequence, a set of three piano solo pieces by John Ireland
 Sarnia, a novel by British author John Christopher (pen name of Samuel Youd)